The 2018 Sky Blue FC season is the team's ninth season as a professional women's soccer team. Sky Blue FC plays in the National Women's Soccer League, the top tier of women's soccer in the United States. Sky Blue had a difficult season in 2018 as they finished in last place. They went 23 games without winning a game, setting the mark for the longest winless streak in NWSL history. Sky Blue finally won on September 8 as they beat the Orlando Pride 1-0 in their final game of the 2018 season.

There were numerous reports of off-field issues that came out after former Sky Blue player Sam Kerr spoke to the media following the Sky Blue vs Chicago game on July 7. Reports of poor management and training facilities as well as housing, travel, and transportation issues were also reported, and were believed to be contributing factors to the team's poor performance on the field.

Team

First-team roster

Source: Sky Blue FC

Match results

Preseason

Regular season

League table

Results summary

Results by round

Honors and awards

NWSL Yearly Awards

NWSL Rookie of the Year

NWSL Team of the Year

NWSL Weekly Awards

NWSL Player of the Week

NWSL Save of the Week

NWSL Goal of the Week

Player transactions

2018 NWSL College Draft

 Source: National Women's Soccer League

In

Out

See also
 2018 National Women's Soccer League season
 2018 in American soccer

Notes

References

Match reports (preseason)

Match reports (regular season)

External links
 

Sky Blue FC
Sky Blue FC
NJ/NY Gotham FC seasons
Sky Blue FC